The Australian men's Paralympic soccer team represents Australia in international 7-a-side competitions. Officially nicknamed the Pararoos, the team is currently controlled by the governing body for soccer in Australia, Football Australia (FA), which are a member of the Asian Football Confederation (AFC) and the regional ASEAN Football Federation (AFF).

Since the teams foundation in 1998, they have represented Australia at the Paralympics on one occasion in 2000 and participated in nine IFCPF/CPISRA World Championships from 2001 to 2019. Australia achieved their highest result in their debut CPISRA campaign in 2001, beating the United States 1–0 to be positioned 5th out of the total 13 teams qualified. The Pararoos are currently ranked 10th in the IFCPF rankings.

The team consists of neurologically impaired athletes with ataxia, hypertonia or athetosis, playing a similar formatted game to Association Football, with smaller squads, fields and differing throw-in and offside rules.

History

Foundation (1998) 

Following the introduction of 7-a-side football in the 1984 Summer Paralympic games, Australia lacked a governing body to oversee and funding to develop a Paralympic football team. In 1998 the Cerebral Palsy Australian Sport & Recreation Federation (CPASRF) and the Australian Paralympic Committee (APC) collectively established a 7-aside football team in preparation for the countries home Sydney 2000 Paralympics. The team managed by Cornelius Van Eldik and coached by both Russell Marriott and David Cambpell lost all three games in the group stage of their debut Summer Paralympic campaign.

In 2001, the team participated in their first Cerebral Palsy International Sports and Recreation Association (CPISRA) World Games, defeating both Belgium, Scotland and England to finish 2nd and 3rd in both group phases. The team went on to defeat the United States 1–0 to finish the tournament in 5th. In 2005, an agreement was made between CPASRF and APC, to pass the control of the team to Football Australia (FA) who were the governing body of both the Australian men's and Australian women's football teams at the time.

Paul Brown (2006 – 2013) era 

In March 2006, Paul Brown and Kai Lammert were appointed as the head coach and assistant coach of the Paralympic team respectively. This appointment was in preparation for the 2007 CPISRA World Championships, which was the qualifying event for the 2008 Beijing Paralympic games. The team finished 11th in the CPISRA championship rankings and subsequently failed to qualify for the Paralympic games, after heavy defeats from both England and Brazil.

Following the team's poor performance in the championships, Brown travelled across Australia to help strengthen state programs, and monitor progress of players. Additionally, Brown conducting three national camps across the 12 months period prior to the 2011 CPISRA World Championships, which was the qualification event to the 2012 London Paralympic games. Although defeating Spain 4–2, in the opening game of the 2011 CPISRA World Championships, the Pararoos lost to Brazil, Netherlands and England to finish in 11th place and subsequently did not qualify to the 2012 London Paralympic games.

As part of the Australian Sport Commission's (ASC) introduction of the Winning Edge Policy on the 23 June 2014, the Pararoos' funding was cut by $175,000, with the commission deciding that funding should be prioritised to sports that have the greatest chance of success. Following this decision, head coach Paul Brown launched an online petition for the reinstation of the government funding, with over 82,000 individuals signing the change.org appeal. However, Matthew Favier the ASC Sport director at the time reiterated the commission's decision stating that the “ASC did not believe the team would qualify for Rio”.

In January 2015, the governance of the sport was passed over from the CPISRA to the newly created International Federation of Cerebral Palsy Football (IFCPF) [1]. Paul Brown stepped down from his position as head coach in March 2015.

Kai Lammert (2015 – present) era 
Former assistant manager Kai Lammert was named as the new head coach of the Pararoos in March 2015. During his first months within the job, Football Australia (FA) partnered with the Australian Sports Foundation (ASF) to develop a tax-deductible scheme to raise much needed funds to support the team, in preparation for future football tournaments. With no funding being provided from ASC, the team was able to qualify and travel to Argentina for the inaugural 2017 IFCPF Championships, through crowd sourced funding. The Pararoos ending up finish 10th following a 2–1 defeat to host country Argentina.

In 2018, the team came 2nd in the IFCPF Asia-Oceania Championship after a 7–0 defeat to Iran in the final, to qualify for the renamed IFCPF World Cup in Spain. The Pararoos went on to finish 10th in the IFCPF World Cup, after a 4–2 loss to Canada.

As part of the FIFA Forward 2.0 initiative in 2019, the FA received funding to help Australia's preparations for future international competitions. While also allowing the team to play their first official match in Australia since the 2000 Paralympic games. The game took place on the 30 November 2019, at Cromer Park Sydney, against world number 12, Canada. The Pararoos won the game 5–0, with almost 1200 fans in attendance, being a record for 7-a-side football outside of the Paralympic Games. The game also broke the record for the highest merchandise spend per fan of any Australian national game over the 2019 calendar year. As part of the FIFA initiative 100% of the revenue made on the day was reinstalled into supporting the team. The game also celebrated the 100th match for Pararoos captain David Barber, who holds the record for the most appearances for the Australian Paralympic team.

Team Image

Colours 
The Australian Paralympic soccer team uniform is traditionally the exact same as the Australian men's football team. This features a yellow jersey accompanied by yellow shorts and green socks. While alternatively for the away kit, the shirt and shorts are turquoise, and the socks are yellow. The Australian kits have been supplied by Nike, since 2004.

Sponsorship

Nickname 
The Australian Paralympic teams nickname, the “Pararoos” is used to informally refer to the team, in the media and in conversation. Similar to other Australian national representative sporting team nicknames, the term is a portmanteau word combining Paralympic and Kangaroo.

Recent results and fixtures

2019

2022 
International competitions were cancelled throughout 2020 and 2021 as a result of the COVID-19 pandemic.

Players
Caps and goals correct as of 17 May 2022.

Club Officials

Current technical staff 
Updated as of 22 May 2022.

Managers

Competitive results
Updated as of 22 May 2022.

Paralympic Games

CPISRA World Championships

IFCPF CP Football World Championships

IFCPF Men's World Cup

IFCPF Ranking 
Updated as of 22 May 2022. Best Ranking   Worst Ranking   Best Mover   Worst Mover

ParaMatildas 
ParaMatildas is the Australian national football team for women with cerebral palsy, acquired brain injury and symptoms of stroke. They won silver at the 2022 International Federation of Cerebral Palsy Football Women's World Cup, with USA winning in extra time.

References

External links
FFA Pararoos website

Paralympic
Australia at the Paralympics
National cerebral palsy football teams
Football 7-a-side teams at the 2000 Summer Paralympics